"138 Trek" is a song by DJ Zinc, released as a single in 2000. The song peaked at number 27 on the UK Singles Chart and number one on the UK Dance Singles Chart. DJ Zinc was one of the first drum and bass producers to score a chart hit within the UK garage scene with this song. He then continued to release breaks/garage productions under the alias Jammin. His 2004 release, "Kinda Funky/Go DJ", reached No. 80 in the UK. "138 Trek" samples the drum break from Barry White's "I'm Gonna Love You Just a Little More Baby".

The Guardian listed "138 Trek" at number 7 in their list of "The best UK garage tracks - ranked!" in 2019.

Chart performance

References

1999 songs
2000 singles
DJ Zinc songs
Songs written by DJ Zinc